King Albert may refer to:

Albert I of Belgium (1875–1934)
Albert II of Belgium (born 1934)
Albert I of Germany (1255–1308)
Albert II of Germany (1397–1439)
Albert I of Saxony (1828–1902)
Albert of Sweden (c. 1338–1412)

Other uses
 King Albert (solitaire), a solitaire card game
 Albert, King of Basil, a character in computer game The Legend of Dragoon
 King Albert Siegwald, a character in Mage & Demon Queen
 King Albert, a nickname for Albert King (1923–1992), blues guitarist & singer

See also
 Prince Albert (disambiguation)

Albert